Dreyfus is a 1930 German drama film directed by Richard Oswald and starring Fritz Kortner, Grete Mosheim, and Heinrich George. It portrays the Dreyfus affair and is based on a novel by Bruno Weil. The film's sets were designed by the art directors Franz Schroedter and Hermann Warm. It premiered at the Gloria-Palast in Berlin. In the United States the film was released under the alternative title The Dreyfus Case.

The film was remade the following year in Britain with Cedric Hardwicke in the title role.

Synopsis
In late nineteenth century Alfred Dreyfus, a French army officer of Jewish heritage, is falsely accused of espionage. Found guilty of treason he is drummed out of the army and sent to prison on Devil's Island. His family take up the case of the wronged officer, as does the writer Emile Zola who believes the original investigation was marred by anti-Semitism. Eventually the true culprit Ferdinand Walsin Esterhazy is exposed.

Cast

References

Bibliography

External links

1930 films
1930s biographical drama films
1930s historical drama films
German biographical drama films
German historical drama films
Films of the Weimar Republic
Films about the Dreyfus affair
Films directed by Richard Oswald
German multilingual films
Films set in Paris
German black-and-white films
Films with screenplays by Fritz Wendhausen
Cultural depictions of Georges Clemenceau
1930 multilingual films
1930 drama films
1930s German films